Law of Ruins is an album by the American noise rock band Six Finger Satellite. It was released in 1998 through Sub Pop.

Critical reception
The Palm Beach Post wrote: "Armed with Moogs and electronic effects, paying homage to Devo, Kraftwerk and electronica, and not afraid to cut lyrically incomprehensible, relentlessly driving songs that clock in at over 10 minutes, 6FS is not for the faint of heart or easily disturbed."

Track listing

Personnel 
Six Finger Satellite
James Apt – bass guitar, clarinet
John MacLean – guitar, synthesizer
Richard Ivan Pelletier – drums, drum machine
Jeremiah Ryan – vocals, Moog synthesizer
Additional musicians and production
Alan Douches – mastering
Jeff Kleinsmith – design
James Murphy – production, engineering, mixing
Six Finger Satellite – production, engineering, mixing

References

External links 
 

Six Finger Satellite albums
1998 albums
Sub Pop albums
Albums produced by James Murphy (electronic musician)